Bayt Naqquba (also spelled Bait Naqquba) was a Palestinian village in British Mandate Palestine, located 9.5 kilometers west of Jerusalem, near Abu Ghosh. Before Palmach and Haganah troops occupied the village during Operation Nachshon on April 11, 1948, approximately 300 Palestinian Arabs lived there. After the 1948 Arab–Israeli War, a moshav named Beit Nekofa was founded close to the site by Jewish immigrants from Yugoslavia.   In 1962, residents of Bayt Naqubba built a new village named Ein Naqquba, south of Beit Nekofa.

History
In 1838 Beit Nikoba was noted as a Muslim village, located in the District of Beni Malik, west of Jerusalem.

In 1863 Victor Guérin found the village  located on cultivated slopes, with  200 inhabitants, while an Ottoman village list from about 1870 found 23 houses and a population of 88, though that population count included  men, only.

In 1883,  the PEF's Survey of Western Palestine (SWP)  described Bayt Naqquba  as a village built on a slope with a spring to the south.

Around 1896 the population of  Bet Nakuba was estimated to be about 135 persons.

British Mandate era
In the 1922 census of Palestine, during the early British Mandate of Palestine period,  there were 120 villagers, all Muslims,  increasing  in the 1931 census  to 177 Muslims, in 41 houses.

The villagers planted olive trees and vineyards, which grew mainly west of the village and on the valley floors, and irrigated their crops with water drawn from the village springs. Olive trees covered 194 dunum of land.  In  the 1944/5 statistics, the village had a population of 240 Muslims, and  the total land area was  2,797  dunams. 303 dunums were irrigated or used for orchards, 515  dunams were for cereals, while 9 dunams were built-up (urban) Arab land.

1948, and after

Like the people of Abu Ghosh, the inhabitants of Bayt Naqquba were known for their friendly relations with their Jewish neighbors in Kibbutz Kiryat Anavim.
Benny Morris writes: "It is possible that the inhabitants of  Beit Naqquba had received both an order to evacuate from Arab military commanders in Ein Karim and "strong advice" to the same effect from Lisser and Navon. But it is likely that the "advice" given in the name of the Harel Brigade, which physically controlled the area, was more potent of the two factors in precipitating the evacuation." The village was taken around the 11 April 1948 during Operation Nachshon.

Between 1948 and 1964 the inhabitants of Bayt Naqquba lived at Sataf, "under trees, because the Arabs had not allowed them to come over their lines, out of distrust and revenge". Afterwards they were allowed to stay temporarily in Abu Ghosh. In 1962, they established a new village, Ein Naqquba on some of their land south of the Jerusalem-Tel Aviv highway.

The village today

See also
 Depopulated Palestinian locations in Israel
 Jerusalem District

References

Bibliography

See also
Welcome Bayt  Naquba
Bayt Naqquba, Zochrot
Survey of Western Palestine, Map 17:  IAA, Wikimedia commons
Bayt Naqquba from the Khalil Sakakini Cultural Center

Arab villages depopulated prior to the 1948 Arab–Israeli War
Jerusalem District
Arab localities in Israel
District of Jerusalem